Frances Coady is a veteran British publisher. who started Vintage paperbacks in the UK before moving to New York as the publisher of Picador where she is now a literary agent at the Aragi agency.

Early life 
Born in London, Frances Coady has degrees from the University of Sussex and the University of Essex.

Career 
Coady began her publishing career in 1982 in London at Faber & Faber where she published Self Help by Lorrie Moore, The Final Passage and The European Tribe by Caryl Philips, and Edward Said’s The World, the Text, and the Critic and After the Last Sky. In 1987 she became editorial director of Jonathan Cape  and was featured in The Powers That Will Be - We choose the People Who Will Run Britain In the Nineties  in the Sunday Times Magazine. In 1989 she became the founding publisher of Vintage paperbacks“whose stunning success launched a thousand embarrassing moments in editorial conferences throughout Britain” according to The Independent. She continued to edit and publish authors including Edward W Said(Culture & Imperialism); Salman Rushdie(The Moor’s Last Sigh) and John Pilger(A Secret Country).

In 1993 Coady became the publisher of the newly created literary division of Random House UK, and “one of the most powerful women in British publishing".  She left Random House to relaunch Granta Books as a fully independent publishing house publishing in 1997.

In 2000 Coady moved to New York to become the publisher of Picador USA an imprint of the Macmillan Group which she turned into a paperback house with bestsellers and award winning authors including Michael Chabon’s Amazing Adventures of Kavalier & Clay; Per Petterson’s Out Stealing Horses, Edmund De Waal’s The Hare with Amber Eyes and Edward St Aubyn’s Patrick Melrose Novels.

She also published Frances Coady Books within Henry Holt and Farrar Straus & Giroux including– Naomi Klein’s The Shock Doctrine; Richard Powers' Generosity and; Andrew Sean Greer’s The Confessions of Max Tivoli. Vintage originals included Deborah Eisenberg's The Collected Stories and Esi Edugyan’s Half Blood Blues.  In September 2012 Coady was hired by Scott Rudin and Barry Diller of IAC to found a new publishing house Brightline which became Atavist Books. Atavist Books launched in 2014 with Karen Russell's Sleep Donation

As a literary agent at Aragi, Coady’s authors include- Sharon Olds; Claudia Rankine; Ocean Vuong; Michael Cunningham, and Rebecca Solnit.

Personal life 

She is married to the novelist Peter Carey.

References

Publishers (people) from London
Year of birth missing (living people)
British expatriates in the United States
20th-century publishers (people)
Alumni of the University of Essex
Alumni of the University of Sussex
21st-century publishers (people)
Women book publishers (people)
21st-century British businesspeople
20th-century British businesspeople
20th-century British businesswomen
British company founders
British women business executives
Living people